is a 1990–1991 cyberpunk original video animation. It was directed by Yoshiaki Kawajiri. Set in the year 2808 in the city of Oedo (Tokyo), it tells the story of three criminals who are enlisted into fighting crime in exchange for reduced sentences. They are Sengoku, an anti-social maverick, Gogul, a mohawk wearing hacker, and Benten, an androgynous bishōnen.

The UK release of the OVA includes a completely new score by Rory McFarlane.

Premise 
To combat computerised crime more effectively, the Cyber Police unit of the future Japanese city of Oedo has restarted the feudal practice of hōmen (放免), employing hardened criminals with a history of hi-tech offences and other crimes such as murder as officers themselves, despite this being, quite clearly, a terrible idea.

Three such criminals are Sengoku, Gogul and Benten, who are serving their 300-or-more year sentences in an orbital penitentiary. For duty served, each criminal will receive a reduction in their prison time. Desperate to get away from the boredom and monotony of jail life, they half-heartedly agree to the deal. They answer to police chief Hasegawa, who keeps them in check thanks to an explosive collar that each criminal wears around his neck. Hasegawa can blow this collar remotely and it will also explode if they fail to complete their missions within an allocated time period. Each one is also armed with a jitte (the traditional weapon and symbol of authority of the ancient Edo Police), although they also have access to more powerful weaponry.

Although there are no specifics to what kind of society the series is based in, it is presented as very high-tech but with a rather dystopian feel. In the first episode for example, a man under pressure confesses to a murder (which he did commit) and which is responsible for the present crisis. This is enough for Hasegawa to order Sengoku to kill the man there and then without so much as a trial. When Sengoku fails to do so his sentence is increased.

Episode list

Cast

Related media

Video game 
 is a graphic adventure game released on March 15, 1991 for the PC-Engine CD-ROM² by Nippon Computer System exclusively in Japan. The storyline is completely original and not an adaptation of any episode.

Music 

{{Infobox album
| name       = Cyber City Oedo 808
| type       = Soundtrack
| artist     = Rory McFarlane
| cover      = 417X0KCKQFL.jpg
| alt        =
| released   = 30 January 1995 
| recorded   =
| venue      =
| studio     =
| genre      = Alternative rockSynthwaveAmbientProgressive
| length     = 46:56
| label      = Demon Records (out of print)DSCD-808| producer   = Rory McFarlane
| prev_title =
| prev_year  =
| next_title =
| next_year  =
}}
The original British VHS release (also televised on Channel 4 circa 1995) features a more rock-centric 23 track score composed by Rory McFarlane not present on the US or Japanese versions. McFarlane's score combined metal, electronica and ambient styles. It has been out of print for years and, as such, is very rare to find on CD, but it is known to be available on the internet. The UK soundtrack has a considerably different tone than the original (more pop-like) Japanese score. Due to Manga Entertainment UK losing the rights to the Cyber City series this edition of the score was unavailable on western DVD releases and remained available only on the old VHS versions from the mid nineties until Anime Limited released the movie on Blu-ray in the UK with the UK Dub and Soundtrack CD included in the release.

Reception
Critical reception of Cyber City Oedo 808 has been generally positive, and has received a cult following over the years. 

Hemanth Kissoon of Filmulation.com reviewed the series in 2007, saying that the series "was released 17 years ago, yet still stands up as a gripping take on Japan’s potential future."

Stig Høgset of THEM Anime Reviews gave the series a rating of 4 out of 5 stars, with his only criticism being very little character development. He states that the series “rounds off a nicely paced trilogy of stories starring an intriguing cast of different characters and set in a gray, leaden metropolis. It goes from action-filled to conspiringly suspenseful and ends with a legendary battle ballet culminating in a beautiful and melancholy ending.”

In popular culture
Clips of Cyber City Oedo 808'' were used to create the official video for the track "Innocence" by Nero. The video was uploaded to YouTube by UKF and Nero's Vevo channel.

British DJ Lone released a song entitled "Oedo 808" on his 2018 EP Ambivert Tools Vol. 4.

References

External links 

1990 anime OVAs
Central Park Media
Cyberpunk anime and manga
Films set in the 29th century
Madhouse (company)
1991 video games
Adventure games
Japan-exclusive video games
TurboGrafx-CD games
TurboGrafx-CD-only games
Vampires in anime and manga
Video games based on anime and manga
Video games developed in Japan
Films directed by Yoshiaki Kawajiri